Sanoussy Ba (born 5 January 2004) is a German professional footballer who plays as a  left-back and wing-back for Bundesliga club RB Leipzig.

Early life 
Sanoussy Ba was born in Hof, Bavaria, where he started playing football with VfB Moschendorf, before joining the town's main club, SpVgg Bayern Hof.

Club career 
Sanoussy Ba joined RB Leipzig in 2016, where he entered the first team on the summer 2022. During the pre-season, he played the friendly against Klopp's Liverpool.

Ba made his professional debut for RB Leipzig on the 30 August 2022, replacing Mohamed Simakan at the hour mark of a 8–0 away Cup win to FC Teutonia Ottensen. He became a regular feature in the match-day squad, both in Bundesliga, and in the Champions League, figuring on the bench during the 2–0 away win against Celtic FC.

International career 
Born in Germany, Ba is of Senegalese descent. He is a youth international for Germany, having started playing with the under-18s in the late summer 2021.

Style of play 
An ambidextrous footballer, Sanoussy Ba is able to play both as a full-back or higher, as a wing-back even an offensive winger, always on the left side.

References

External links
Profile at the RB Leipzig website

2004 births
Living people
People from Hof, Bavaria
German footballers
Germany youth international footballers
German people of Senegalese descent
Association football defenders
RB Leipzig players
Bundesliga players